Taniela is a given name of Pacific Islander origin. Notable people with the name include:

Taniela Lasalo, Australian rugby league player
Taniela Moa, Tongan rugby union player
Taniela Rawaqa, Fijian rugby union player
Taniela Tuiaki, New Zealand rugby league player
Taniela Waqa, Fijian footballer